Playa Grande ("Big beach") is the administrative centre of the municipality of Ixcán in the Guatemalan department of El Quiché.

Native Mayan languages spoken in the area include, among many others, Uspantek and Q'eqchi', although Spanish is also common.

Its annual festival is held from 15 to 17 May.

Playa Grande has an airport, Playa Grande Airport.  Its International Air Transport Association code is PKJ.

Xalalá hydroelectric dam

The Xalalá hydroelectric dam is a proposed development project in Ixcán.  It is controversial because it will flood 31.8 km2 and displace twelve Q'eqchi' Maya communities.
It is a project of the Plan Puebla Panama.  The dam is opposed by the Organizational Commission of the Community Consultation of Good Faith,
Ixcán, which wants the Instituto Nacional de Electrificación (INDE) to complete consultations with local indigenous groups pursuant to the  International Labour Organization Convention No. 169, Article 7.  The municipal government called for such a consultation on 2007-04-20.

See also
Ixcán
El Quiché
List of airports in Guatemala
Plan Puebla Panama
Guatemalan Civil War
Mayan languages
Uspantek language
Q'eqchi' language

References 

 Citypopulation.de Population of cities & towns in Guatemala

External links
Servicio de Información Municipal (in Spanish)

Populated places in the Quiché Department
Populated places established in 1985
1985 establishments in Guatemala